Alice Blanche Balfour  (20 October 1850 – 12 June 1936) was a Scottish entomologist, naturalist, scientific illustrator and one of the earliest pioneers in the science of genetics.

Life
Balfour was born on 20 October 1850 at Whittingehame House in East Lothian, the daughter of Lady Blanche Gascoyne-Cecil (1825–1872) and James Maitland Balfour. She lived much of her adult life in London with her brother Arthur Balfour, 1st Earl of Balfour who was Prime Minister of the United Kingdom from 1902 to 1905. Her brother Francis Maitland Balfour was elected a Fellow of the Royal Society at the age of 27 for his work on embryology.

She developed a lifelong interest in entomology and later developed an interest in genetics and in particular the way that the patterns in zebra skins were inherited. She had a lengthy correspondence with James Cossar Ewart Professor of Zoology at University of Edinburgh who himself had a professional interest in the development of the horse. The correspondence relates to the possibility of cross-breeding zebra with horses to reduce the impact of tsetse fly on horses in Africa.

In 1895 she published the book Twelve Hundred miles in a Waggon which describes a trip taken by herself, H. W. Fitzwilliam, Albert Grey and his wife, and Albert Grey's cousin George Grey.

She was elected a Fellow of the Royal Entomological Society of London on 7 June 1916.

Balfour died on 12 June 1936 at Wittingehame House.

References

1850 births
1936 deaths
Alice
Scottish geneticists
Scottish entomologists
Women geneticists
Women entomologists
Scottish women scientists
19th-century British women scientists
20th-century British women scientists
People from Dunbar
Scottish travel writers
British women travel writers
Fellows of the Royal Entomological Society